Maybe This Time may refer to:
"Maybe This Time" (song), a song from the 1972 film Cabaret
Maybe This Time (TV series), an American sitcom
Maybe This Time (1980 film), an Australian film starring Judy Morris
Maybe This Time (2014 film), a Filipino romantic film
"Maybe This Time", a song by Michael Martin Murphey from the album The Heart Never Lies